The R724 is a Regional Route in South Africa.

Route
Its northern terminus is the R707 at Petrus Steyn. It heads south to end at the R76 at Bethlehem.

References 

Regional Routes in the Free State (province)